Robert Dudley (September 13, 1869 – September 15, 1955) was a dentist turned film character actor who, in his 35-year career, appeared in more than 115 films.

Career
Dudley was born in Cincinnati, Ohio and was educated at Lake Forest College in Evanston, Illinois and Chicago, where he majored in oral surgery. In 1917 he appeared in his first film, Seven Keys to Baldpate, and then made three other silent films through 1921. After 1922 he worked consistently, appearing in three or four films a year, and making the transition to sound films in 1929 with The Bellamy Trial. Dudley often played characters with a quick temper, including jurors, shopkeepers, ticket agents, court clerks and justices of the peace, as well as an occasional farmer, hobo, or laborer. His performances in these small parts were frequently uncredited. 

In the 1940s, Dudley was part of Preston Sturges' unofficial "stock company" of character actors, appearing in six films written and directed by Sturges. His most distinctive and memorable role for Sturges was the Wienie King in 1942's The Palm Beach Story, the rich man with a big hat who spontaneously bankrolls Claudette Colbert and Joel McCrea on their escapade.

Personal life and death 
The 5' 9" Dudley, who was the founder of the Troupers Club of Hollywood, was married to Elaine Anderson, and they had two girls, Jewell and Patricia Lee. He made his final film As Young as You Feel in 1951 and died on September 15, 1955, in San Clemente, California.

Partial filmography

 Seven Keys to Baldpate (1917)
 Out of a Clear Sky (1918)
 The Traveling Salesman (1921)
 One a Minute (1921, uncredited)
 The Ninety and Nine (1922)
 Making a Man (1922)
 The Tiger's Claw (1923)
 Sixty Cents an Hour (1923)
 The Day of Faith (1923)
 Nobody's Bride (1923)
 The Extra Girl (1923, uncredited)
 Flapper Wives (1924)
 On the Stroke of Three (1924)
 A Woman of the World (1925, uncredited)
 The Marriage Clause (1926)
 Good Time Charley (1927, uncredited)
 Broadway Madness (1927)
 Lure of the Night Club (1927)
 The Night Flyer (1928)
 Skinner's Big Idea (1928)
 Fools for Luck (1928)
 The Bellamy Trial (1929)
 Fast Freight (1929)
 Shanghai Rose (1929)
 Big News (1929)
 The Mysterious Island (1929)
 Dames Ahoy! (1930)
 Range Law (1931, uncredited)
 Three Wise Girls (1932)
 Reunion (1932)
 The Mighty Treve (1937)
 Racketeers in Exile (1937)
 Zenobia (1939) (UK: 'Elephants Never Forget')
 Sullivan's Travels (1941)
 The Palm Beach Story (1942)
 The Ghost and the Guest (1943)
 Happy Land (1943)
 The Miracle of Morgan's Creek (1944)
 It Happened Tomorrow (1944)
 The Great Moment (1944)
 The Big Noise (1944)
 Nothing but Trouble (1944)
 Singin' in the Corn (1946)
 The Sin of Harold Diddlebock (1947)
 Magic Town (1947)
 Strike It Rich (1948)
 Portrait of Jennie (1948, uncredited)
 As Young as You Feel (1951, uncredited)

References

External links

Robert Dudley at AllMovie.com

1869 births
1955 deaths
Male actors from Ohio
American male film actors
American male silent film actors
Lake Forest College alumni
20th-century American male actors